is a passenger railway station in the city of Minamibōsō, Chiba Prefecture, Japan, operated by the East Japan Railway Company (JR East).

Lines
Chikura Station is served by the Uchibō Line, and is located 96.6 km from the terminus of the line at Soga Station.

Station layout
The station consists of one side platform and one island platform serving three tracks, connected to the station building by a footbridge. The station has a staffed ticket office and a local tourist information desk.

Platforms

History
Chikura Station opened on June 1, 1921. The station was absorbed into the JR East network upon the privatization of the Japan National Railways (JNR) on April 1, 1987. A new station building was completed in February 2007.

Passenger statistics
In fiscal 2019, the station was used by an average of 338 passengers daily (boarding passengers only).

Surrounding area
 Chikura fishing port
 former Chikura Town Hall

See also
 List of railway stations in Japan

References

External links

 JR East Station information 

Railway stations in Chiba Prefecture
Railway stations in Japan opened in 1921
Uchibō Line
Minamibōsō